Darius Milhaud's Sonata for flute, oboe, clarinet and piano was composed in 1918. Written immediately after the Fourth String Quartet, it is a true quartet for winds and piano. It lasts approximately 18 minutes and consists of four movements, ending in an emotional slow finale.

 Tranquille
 Joyeux
 Emporté
 Douloureux

References
 Guide de la musique de chambre. François-René Tranchefort et al. Page 920 [Spanish edition].

External links
Video – Darius Milhaud – Sonata for flute, oboe, clarinet and piano (17:24).

1918 compositions
Compositions by Darius Milhaud